Bramhall is a suburb of the Metropolitan Borough of Stockport.

People
 Andrea Bramhall, British writer
 Art Bramhall (1909–1985), American baseball player
 Doyle Bramhall (1949-2011), American singer-songwriter and drummer
 Doyle Bramhall II (born 1968?), guitarist and vocalist in his band Smokestack and was also the second guitarist in Eric Clapton's band from 2004 to 2009
 John Bramhall (1594-1633), Anglican bishop and philosopher; Archbishop of Armagh
 John Bramhall (footballer) (born 1956), former English professional footballer
 Mae Bramhall (c. 1861 – 1897), American actress and writer